The Kwavi people were a community commonly spoken of in the folklore of a number of Kenyan and Tanzanian communities that inhabited regions of south-central Kenya and north-central Tanzania at various points in history. The conflicts between the Uasin Gishu/Masai and Kwavi form much of the literature of what are now known as the Iloikop wars.

Etymology
Krapf's (1854) account on the Kwavi was the earliest and for a long time influenced accounts about the Kwavi community. On their name, he states;
 

Later writers, writing a few decades later by which point the community had collapsed seemed to indicate that Krapf's designation was not quite accurate. None provided an alternative however. Johnston writing in 1886 for instance, noted that "'Kwavi' is supposed to be a corrupted version of 'El-oigob'"(i.e. Loikop). He also noted that the term Loikop at the time implied settled residence. In another account (1902) he states "...'Kwavi',a name that no Masai can recognise or explain, but which has been perpetuated owing to its adoption by Krapf".

Origins
Krapf (1860) recorded a reference to the Kwavi in Wanyika mythology. According to the myth, 'the Galla, Wakamba and Wakuafi had one common father whose eldest son was called Galla'. Galla is said to have raided another community's cattle upon which his brothers Mkamba and Mkuafi asked for a share of the booty but were refused by their brother Galla. Mkuafi is said to have then raided Galla following which he in turn was robbed by his brother Mkamba and vice versa. From that time arose deadly enmity between the brothers which has had no end.

History
Writing in 1854, Krapf portrays a previously powerful community that was under significant Maasai pressure, accounts from later writers would show that the Kwavi community was collapsing under Maasai attacks at the time Krapf was writing about them. Krapf notes that the Kwavi had previously been "the terror of the agricultural tribes of Jagga, Ukamabani, Teita, Usambara and on the sea-coast".

c.1830 misfortunes

Thomson, on his journey through Masai land in 1883, wrote of a series of misfortunes that befell and seriously enfeebled the Kwavi people.

The 'Kisongo' referred to here by Thomson being the Wa-hehe, who according to Johnston (1902), "had been virilised by a slight intermixture of Zulu blood".

Maasai - Kwavi war

Territory
Krapf (1854) recorded that;

Krapf states further on that "regarding Oldoinio eibor it is necessary to remark that by this term is meant the Kirénia or Endurkenia, or simply Kenia, as the Wakamba call it..."

Peoples
Ludwig Krapf (1854) recorded accounts of the Engánglima from Lemāsěgnǒt whose father was "Engobore, an Mkuafi of the tribe Engánglima" who had "married a woman in the Interior near Oldoinio eibŏr (white mountain)" by whom he got his son, Lemāsěgnǒt. Krapf notes that Engobore resolved to reside at a place called Muasuni which was situated on the upper course of the Pangani river in the vicinity of the kingdom of Usambara when he returned from the interior. Krapf states that "the reason which had induced Engobore to join the nomadic settlement of the Wakuafi tribe Barrabuyu...was because his own tribe Engánglima had during his stay in the interior been nearly annihilated by the wild Masai". His account of his informant alludes to a corporate identity that he refers to as 'Wakuafi' which had within it at least two sections, that he refers to as Engánglima and Barrabuyu.

Enganglima
Krapf noted that the Enganglima territory;

Joseph Thomson wrote of the 'Wa-kwafi' and their territory which by his description is roughly contiguous with Engánglima territory as recorded by Krapf. Thomson stated that;

Parakuyo

Way of life
Writing in the mid-19 century, Krapf detailed a way of life that he noted was common to the 'Wakuafi' and the 'Masai'.

Residence
When the Kwavi and Masai settled at a place for a period of time, they built a large town known as Orlmamara. A smaller town was known as Engany, and a settlement that promised to be important and was large was styled Enganassa. These settlements consisted of huts, covered with cow-hide or grass and were surrounded by thorn hedges and ditches for protection against enemy attack.

Subsistence
Krapf noted that the Kwavi were nomadic, settling for months at a time when they found pasture and water. They lived entirely on milk, butter, honey and the meat of black cattle, goats, sheep, and game. The Kwavi supplemented their herds by raiding other communities for cattle based on a mythological belief that all cattle on earth belonged to them (and Masai) by divine gift. A notable food belief held by the Kwavi was that nourishment provided by cereals enfeebles and was thus only suited to the tribes of the mountains in their territories. The opposite was held to be true, that a diet of meat and milk gives strength and courage and were thus the only proper food for the Kwavi.

Warfare
The weapons of the Kwavi and Maasai consisted of a spear, a large oblong shield, and a club that was round and thick at the top. The latter was used with great precision and to devastating effect at a distance of fifty to seventy paces and it was this weapon above all that struck fear in East African communities, 'the Suahili with their muskets not excepted'.

The fighting force was composed of all Kwavi men roughly between the ages of twenty and twenty five.  They were known as Elmoran.

Diaspora
Thomson in his account notes that the Kwavi were "not all scattered" following their defeat at the hands of the Maasai. He notes that two large divisions of the Kwavi kept together, one cutting through Kikuyu and settling in 'Lykipia' while the other crossed the Rift to settle in Uasin Gishu. He further records that "In both districts they found superb grazing-grounds and plenty of elbow-room, and there for a time they remained quietly, and increased rapidly in numbers".

 Laikipiak people
 Uasin Gishu people

References

Tribes of Africa